Haroa Assembly constituency is an assembly constituency in North 24 Parganas district in the Indian state of West Bengal.

Overview
As per orders of the Delimitation Commission, 121 Haroa Assembly constituency is composed of the following: Falti Beleghata, Dadpur, Kiritipur I, Kiritipur II, Shashan gram panchayats of Barasat II community development block, Champatala, Deganga I, Deganga II, Hadipur Jhikra II gram panchayats of Deganga community development block, and 3. Gopalpur I, Gopalpur II, Haroa and Khasbalanda gram panchayats of Haroa community development block.

Haroa Assembly constituency is part of 18. Basirhat (Lok Sabha constituency).

Members of Legislative Assembly

Election Results

2021

2016

2011

.# Swing calculated on Congress+Trinamool Congress vote percentages taken together in 2006.

1977–2006
In the 2006 state assembly elections, Asim Kumar Das of CPI(M) won the 97 Haroa (SC) assembly seat defeating his nearest rival Mrityunjoy Mondal of Trinamool Congress. Contests in most years were multi cornered but only winners and runners are being mentioned. Kshiti Ranjan Mondal of CPI(M) defeated Lakshmikanta Mondal of Congress in 2001 and 1996, Kumud Ranjan Roy of Congress in 1991, Lakshmikanta Mondal of Congress in 1987, Gangadhar Pramanick of Congress in 1982 and Brajendra Nath Sarkar of Janata Party in 1977.

1951–1972
Gangadhar Pramanick of Congress won in 1972 and 1971. Brajendra Nath Sarkar of Bangla Congress won in 1969. Gangadhar Pramanick representing Bangla Congress won in 1967. Jehangir Kabir of Congress won in 1962 and 1957. In independent India's first election in 1951, Jyotish Chandra Roy Sardar of Congress and Hemanta Kumar Ghoshal of CPI won the Haroa Sandeshkhali joint seat.

References

Assembly constituencies of West Bengal
Politics of North 24 Parganas district